Karolis Jasaitis (born 1 November 1982) is a former Lithuanian football player.

International career
In 2006, he made a brief appearance for the Lithuanian national team in a friendly against Andorra, but was injured after just 2 minutes. The broken leg he sustained had kept him out of action for 6 months.

External links

Lithuanian footballers
Lithuania international footballers
1982 births
Living people
A Lyga players
FK Žalgiris players
FK Sūduva Marijampolė players
FK Tauras Tauragė players
Lithuanian expatriate footballers
Expatriate footballers in Russia
Lithuanian expatriate sportspeople in Russia
Expatriate footballers in Norway
Lithuanian expatriate sportspeople in Norway
Association football midfielders
FC Nizhny Novgorod (2007) players